Bennet Graham Burley (1840 – June 17, 1914) was a Scottish-born pirate, Confederate spy and journalist. Later in life, he changed his surname to Burleigh and became a celebrated war correspondent for London's The Daily Telegraph.

Born in Glasgow, he began work as a shipping clerk at the age of 20. Shortly afterwards, he was forced to marry one of the family's servants after getting her pregnant. Burley left for North America with another clerk to take part in the American Civil War. He joined the Confederates, disrupting Union ship traffic. Burley was captured in May 1864 but escaped a month later. He took part in a raid on Lake Erie in September 1864 led by John Yates Beall. Burley had convinced a Canadian cousin in Guelph, Adam Robertson, to manufacture munitions for use in that raid. He returned to Guelph but was later captured and extradited to the United States. The jury deadlocked at his first trial and he was returned to jail to await a second trial. Burley was able to escape to Canada and returned to Scotland. At this point, he changed his name to Bennet Burleigh.

In 1881, Burleigh was hired by the London Telegraph to cover the war in Sudan. He was a correspondent for the Central News Agency during the bombardment of Alexandria in 1882. Burleigh was the first to report the failure of the Gordon relief expedition, which led to the slaughter of the Khartoum garrison. He also covered the Boer War and the Russo-Japanese War. He authored several books on his experiences reporting on conflict.

Burleigh ran unsuccessfully several times for Glasgow seats in the British parliament.

He died in Bexhill on June 17, 1914 and was buried in Brookwood Cemetery.

Burleigh is thought by some to be a model for the correspondent Gilbert Torpenhow in Rudyard Kipling's The Light that Failed.

Bibliography 
 Khartoum Campaign 1898: or the Reconquest of the Soudan, 1899
 The Natal Campaign, 1900
 Empire of the East; or, Japan and Russia at war, 1904-5, 1905
 Greaves, Graeden: Wild Bennet Burleigh: The Pen and the Pistol. 2012

References

External links
 
 

1840 births
1914 deaths
British war correspondents
War correspondents of the Balkan Wars
American Civil War spies
Journalists from Glasgow
Scottish Labour Party (1888) politicians
Burials at Brookwood Cemetery
Liberal Unionist Party parliamentary candidates
British emigrants to the United States